{{Infobox comic book title 
|title           = Monstress
|image           = Monstress-01.png
|caption         = Monstress #1 cover
|schedule        = 
|ongoing=y
|publisher       = Image Comics
|date            = November 2015 – present
|issues          = 42
|genre           = 
|main_char_team  = 
|writers         = Marjorie Liu
|artists         = Sana Takeda
|pencillers      = 
|inkers          = 
|letterers       = Rus Wooton
|editors         = Jennifer M. Smith
|creators        = Marjorie Liu & Sana Takeda
|subcat          = Image Comics
|sort            = Monstress (comic book)
|TPB1            = '1. Awakening
|ISBN1           = 9781632157096
|TPB2            = '2. The Blood
|ISBN2           = 9781534300415
|TPB3            = '3. Haven
|ISBN3           = 9781534306912
|TPB4            = '4. The Chosen
|ISBN4           = 9781534313361
|TPB5            = '5.''' Warchild
|ISBN5           = 9781534316614
|TPB6            = '6. The Vow
|ISBN6           = 9781534319158
|TPB7='7. Devourer|ISBN7=9781534323193}}Monstress is an ongoing epic fantasy comics series written by Marjorie Liu and drawn by Sana Takeda, published since November 2015 by the American publisher Image Comics.

The comic was described as "ambitious as George R. R. Martin or J. R. R. Tolkien" for its high fantasy concepts and heavy world-building. The series has earned many awards, including five Eisner Awards, four Hugo Awards, and the Harvey Awards Book of the Year in 2018.

Summary
The series is set in a matriarchal world inspired by early 20th-century Asia, and tells the story of Maika Halfwolf, a teenage girl who shares a mysterious psychic link with a powerful monster. The background to the story is a war between the Arcanics, magical creatures who sometimes can pass for human, and the human Federation, lead by the Cumaea, an order of sorceresses who consume Arcanics to fuel their power. Maika is an Arcanic who looks human, and who is set on learning about and avenging her dead mother. Maika's left arm has been severed and a "monster", Zinn, occasionally emerges from its stub. The demon, who takes over her body and mind, is a source of great power, but challenging for Maika to understand and control. The story unfolds as Maika navigates through the power games of the factions of humans and arcanics while learning truths about the "Ancients" and her family that change her perspective.

Publication history
Liu first introduced the story to Takeda in 2013. The two started working together a year later, and the first issue was published in November 2015; the trade paperback first volume in July 2016, the second in July 2017, the third in September 2018, and the fourth in September 2019.

Liu has said that she struggled with depression before writing Monstress. She had taken a hiatus from writing before returning to the industry with Image Comics.

She has described the comic as "a huge epic fantasy." As such, the story required world-building. The first issue was triple-sized (70 pages) in order to properly introduce the various characters and factions.

Liu and Takeda first worked together on Liu's run of X-23 for Marvel. Liu would later describe her work with Takeda as "a wonderful process; it felt like she was reading my mind." A native of Japan, Takeda's art takes inspiration from manga.

Themes

According to Liu, among the series's themes are the inner strength required to withstand constant dehumanization, as well as the power of friendship among women. Race also plays a large role in the series. In the series the Arcanics, a race of magical creatures, have been at war with humans for decades, and they are now at a stalemate; however the humans are taking Arcanics and selling them as slaves to other humans.

Reception
At the review aggregator website Comic Book Roundup, the series received an average score of 9.0 out of 10 based on 212 reviews.

The first, triple-sized issue of Monstress received critical praise. Writing for Kotaku, Evan Narcisse called it "a gorgeous comic book about racism, war and slavery", noting the intricate detail of Takeda's manga-inspired art. Reviewing the book for The A.V. Club, Caitlin Rosberg described the leading characters, all women, as "deeply flawed and showing layers of nuanced characterization that you don’t often see in comic books", and appreciated the series's "sense of in-between-ness—(...) neither traditionally Western nor manga, paced like a novel but drawn like a comic". The comic was described by the Los Angeles Review of Books'' as "ambitious as George R. R. Martin or J. R. R. Tolkien" for its high fantasy concepts and heavy world-building.

Awards and nominations

Collected editions

References

External links
 at Image Comics

2015 comics debuts
Feminist comics
High fantasy comics
Image Comics titles
Eisner Award winners for Best Continuing Series
Harvey Award winners
Hugo Award for Best Graphic Story-winning works